Rohanixalus senapatiensis, commonly known as Senapti's tree frog, is a species of frog in the family Rhacophoridae endemic to north-eastern India. It is only known from its type locality around the Mabing river near Kangpokpi in Senapati district, Manipur state.

Taxonomy 
Formerly described in Chirixalus, it was moved to the new genus Rohanixalus in 2020 following a phylogenetic study.

Description 
It was originally described as being most similar in its appearance to Rohanixalus vittatus. It has a dark middorsal stripe. Webbing on hands is rudimentary.

References 

Rohanixalus
Frogs of India
Endemic fauna of India
Amphibians described in 2009